Vandal Hearts, known in Japan as  is a turn-based tactical role-playing video game developed by Konami Computer Entertainment Tokyo for the PlayStation and later ported to the Sega Saturn by Konami Computer Entertainment Nagoya. The PlayStation version was distributed in Japan, North America, and Europe. The Saturn version was only released in Japan. There was also a Microsoft Windows version which was released only in Japan and South Korea, with Software renderer and Direct3D Support.

The game spawned a sequel, Vandal Hearts II, also for the PlayStation. A prequel, Vandal Hearts: Flames of Judgment was created for the PlayStation Network and Xbox Live Arcade. In 2004, Konami announced a Vandal Hearts game for the Nintendo DS, but it was later cancelled.

Plot 

The descendants and heirs of the holy man Toroah the Messiah assumed absolute political power over the continent of Sostegaria, forming the basis of the Holy Ashah Dynasty and ruling through a combination of religious doctrine and military power for millennia. As time passed, the citizenry began to resent their leaders, and Arris the Sage united the anti-royal factions into a guerrilla army. This Liberation Army outwitted and outmaneuvered the Royal Army, and finally burned down the palace of the Ashah Dynasty. With the monarchy dissolved, the rebels established a ruling council founded on the principles of democracy and popular sovereignty, forming the Republic of Ishtaria. The leaders of the revolution assumed leadership positions, except for Arris himself, who disappeared.

The fledgling republic is in increasingly dire straits: the autocratic Minister of Defense, Hel Spites, and his elite anti-terrorism squad, the Crimson Guard, use ever-increasing force to stamp out resistance to Ishtarian rule, while they allow outlaws to roam the countryside and pirates to sail the seas. Ash Lambert and his colleagues at the third battalion of the Ishtarian Security Forces suspect a conspiracy at the highest levels of government.

Ash, Diego Renault and Clint Picard pose as merchants and find trade routes are being disrupted by bandits backed by corrupt politicians. A riot in the Dover District of the capital Shumeria is started by former nobles of the Ashah Dynasty. Ash, Diego, and Clint convince the rioters to surrender, but The Crimson Guard kills all of them but Count Claymore, the leader. Ash is outraged, but his superior Clive convinces him to back off. Dolf Crowley, a representative from the Young Revolutionary Party, gives Ash a secret mission to find out what happened to General Magnus Dunbar, who disappeared three months ago on a mission on Gilbaris Island. While passing through the ruins of the Ashah Dynasty's castle, Ash, Clint and Diego encounter Eleni Dunbar, adoptive daughter of General Magnus. She and her manservant Huxley Hobbes join Ash. An archer named Kira also joins the band.

Grog Drinkwater takes them to Gilbaris Island, where the people are zombies and evil statues. After the party destroys the statues, the townsfolk revert to their humanity. They say General Magnus Dunbar arrived three months before and entered the ruins. Magnus turned them evil until Ash's party liberated them. On the party's way to the ruins, they meet Magnus's men Captain Dolan, Amon and Sara. The party finds General Magnus under some sort of spell, as the jewel he is carrying gives him inhuman power. After Magnus is beaten, the Magic Stone falls from his grasp. The Crimson Guard arrest Eleni, Magnus and Huxley. They tell Ash that he was integral to uncovering a plot by Magnus to overthrow the government. Ash cannot interfere with the arrests without becoming a traitor. Instead, Ash and his friends liberate Eleni, Magnus, and Huxley from the dungeon. Magnus tells Eleni that the Magic Stone is not good or evil, only power, and it magnifies the bearer's true nature. He sought it to prevent a cout d'etat by Hel Spites. Outside the prison, Dolf confronts the party and reveals Kira was a mole working for him. Dolf tries to use the stone to kill Ash and his companions, but Magnus channels the stone's power and fights back. They rip a hole in time-space which swallows Grog, Magnus, Sara and Ash.

Hel Spites says Magnus was assassinated by terrorists, and has Ronaldo Castille, Ash's boss, arrested. After being promoted to Prime Minister, he stages some rebellions and obtains emergency powers from the Ishtarian Council. He absolves the Council and declares himself emperor. He quashes dissent with a secret police.

Magnus dies. Ash, Grog, and Sara find they are in the Lost Town at the End of the World, where time effectively stops. A man named Zohar overhears them mention the Magic Stone, and decides to accompany Ash. He rips a hole in time-space, which returns the party to three years after they left and reunite with their allies. Ash plans to assault the Imperial Prison to rouse the rebels.

Dolf tells Emperor Hel and the Inner Circle about the Magic Stone. It is from when the Universe was born. This Stone contains a spark of the Flames of Judgement, which almost ruined the world. The Royal Ring is needed to break the seal on the Flames. When Toroah the Messiah saved the world, he used the Royal Ring to seal the Flames within the Stone. The Ring vanished in the Revolution. Dolf is planning a coup against Hel and wants Kira to support him. He has Xeno, an underling, keep an eye on her. Clint is imprisoned with Count Claymore. Claymore tells Clint that the Empire is planning to find the Royal Ring to unlock the Flames. Kira comes and hands Client the cell keys and some weapons, and takes off. Clint and Darius, a cellmate, free Eleni and Amon. Ash's party arrives and saves his friends.

Clive acts as a pipeline to the resistance and works with Ash and his companions. Having been observed by Xeno, Kira is arrested for her part in the jailbreak. Clive sends Ash and company to the town of Kerachi. In the forest between Khanos and Kerachi, the group runs afoul of Xeno. Zohar reveals that Xeno was his apprentice, but lust for power turned him evil, and he trapped Zohar in the "land between time." Xeno wanted to rekindle the Flames. After beating Xeno, the group enters Kerachi and meets with Carlo Lisbon, a well-known businessman. Carlo's agent is finalizing the sale of the Ring. Arriving at the exchange, the party finds out it is a trap set by Xeno, and that Carlo set them up. Xeno creates a flame wall around the party, intending to burn them alive. Carlo tells Xeno that Diego, his son, was to live. When Xeno does not listen, Carlo attacks Xeno, which breaks his concentration and ends the spell. Xeno flees. Carlo apologizes to his son for alienating him. The Ring is being transported by train back to Shumeria. Diego tells his father that when everything is over, Diego will come back to Carlo.

On the train, Ash's party defeat the Crimson Guard and secure the Royal Ring. Xeno shows up and tells them he is holding Kira hostage and to meet him at Fort Dain. Upon arriving at Fort Dain, the party sees Kira being held over a pool of magma. Ash hands over the Ring in exchange for Kira's life, but Xeno betrays his word by releasing the locks on Kira's platform. The party destroys the death device, and saves Kira's life. Kira joins the group. An inscription on the Royal Ring gives coordinates for a place in the Torog Mountains, so the party heads there. Dolf murders Hel and his guard, then claims that the dead guard was Hel's assassin.

Ash and the party slip up to the Torog Mountains and head for Frontier Village, north of the mountains. Eleni has a vision of Frontier Village engulfed in flames. Ash tells Orosius, the leader of the village, why they came. A villager states that while they were out picking healing herbs, they were beset by monsters. The party rushes out to the Tsukue Plains. When they arrive, Orosius' granddaughter Leena casts a protective shield around herself and another villager. Zohar comments that only the strongest and wisest mages know that spell, and also comments on the design in the field, a large eagle or hawk. Ash suspects that Orosius knows more than he is letting on. Back at the village, Ash tells Orosius that he knows the symbols in Toroah's Ark (the ruins on Gilbaris Island) and the spell Leena cast. Orosius relents and tells Ash his people are descendants of the ancient Biruni Empire. They created the Flames of Judgment during an experiment. Ash wants Orosius to help fight Dolf and the Empire. Orosius says if they bring back a claw from Salamander the Dragon, he will help them. Upon returning to the village with the claw, Ash and his companions find it engulfed in flames, just as Eleni predicted. Orosius is cut down, scarring Leena. Kane arrives, but the party beats him back. Orosius tells Leena to take Ash and company to Orome Lake, where they will find a temple. Inside the temple is the sentient sword of destruction, the Vandal Heart. Orosius issues a warning about the sword: like the Magic Stone, it can curse the one who wields it.

Eleni visits Leena at her home and comforts her over the loss of her village and grandfather. Eleni gives Leena her pendant. Once at Orome Lake, Leena casts a spell, making the temple rise from the waters. They guide Leena across the walkways, and she gets them inside the temple. As Leena goes up to unseal the Vandal Heart, Xeno shows up. Xeno uses phase magic to cast a time-space gate at Leena, then flees. Eleni remembers that she is, in fact, Leena. The loss of her grandfather and subsequent trip through time repressed the memories until they started this journey north. Leena comes out 18 years in the past, wearing the pendant that she gave to her younger self. Magnus Dunbar found and adopted her. Eleni unseals Vandal Heart, as she can now remember the incantations.

Ash, now in possession of Vandal Heart, heads back to Shumeria to help the Liberation Army. At Fort Gareth (one of the last of the Empire's strongholds), Ash wants to talk peace. Kane wants Ash dead. Xeno shows up and turns Kane into a soulless killing machine. With no alternatives, Ash lays Kane to rest. The party heads to Cobalt Beach to link up with forces under Clive's command. Vandal Heart wars with Ash over his soul. Voices call out, and only Ash can hear them. Ash changes as Magnus did 3 years prior and lashes out at Eleni. The trauma of his childhood (being called the "son of a traitor") is manifesting through the sword. Ash blows the party back, and strikes Clive down. Ash comes back to his senses as Clive tells Ash his father Aldor was protecting Arris the Sage, who was accused of betraying the Liberation Army. Aldor and Clive fought, and Clive killed Aldor. It later emerged that Aldor told the truth, but Clive did not want to hurt the peace process, so he held his tongue for 18 years. Clive implores Ash to forget the past and believe in himself.

Ash does not think he can continue, even though Clive is going to live. Eleni throws Ash's own words (spoken to her grandfather Orosius) about responsibility back at him. Ash pledges to continue the fight. The party heads off to Shumeria, which they find in chaos. An Imperial soldier tells Ash that Dolf took the Flames and holed up in the Holy Temple. Dolf spoke of a ritual that would destroy the rebel army. After that, monsters appeared and started attacking the soldiers. Xeno shows up and confirms the Flames created a vortex to a dark and evil dimension. The party puts an end to Xeno, then readies themselves for the fight against Dolf. Dolf exclaims that he wants revenge for his father: Arris the Sage. Once Ash and his companions stop Dolf, Ash tries to get Dolf to understand that he does not have to fight any more. Dolf scoffs at Ash, and unleashes the full fury of the Flames of Judgment. Dolf is swallowed up by the expanding Flames. Ash uses Vandal Heart to extinguish the Flames, and disappears in a flash.

Without Hel and Dolf, the fledgling Empire crumbles. Eleni starts a journal as the party drifts off. Dolan becomes a statesman to help rebuild Ishtaria. Kira goes on a journey of self-discovery. Clint became the new head of the DSF, and waits for Kira's return. Diego returns to Kerachi to pick up the family business. Amon becomes Darius' new apprentice. Sara takes a job at a local bakery to be near to Amon. Grog and Zohar sail the world together. Eleni gets letters from faraway lands from time to time. Huxley is working on his stamp collection. As Eleni is finishing a journal entry, Ash finally finds his way back.

Gameplay 
Gameplay is carried out through an isometric viewpoint. Battles are carried out on a series of grid maps, which include cells not accessible like water, trees and buildings. Although the environment is three dimensional with a perspective that can be rotated by the player, the characters are two dimensional sprites. A character's movement allowance for a turn can be used all at once or split, between two or more movements. Turns are on a side-by-side basis; the player moves all of their characters before the AI is allowed to take its turn.

Most stages are completed by killing all the enemy characters. Other stages have different victory conditions, such as killing one particular enemy character, moving characters to a specific location on the map, or killing certain enemies while saving others. In every battle, the death of the party leader results in an immediate loss. Losing other characters in the party causes the loss of gold. The character is gone from the current stage and can return in the next stage. On stages that include rescuing other characters, the death of these characters also results in a loss.

Classes
A variety of characters join the battle party throughout the course of the game. Every character fits into one of seven character classes: Swordsman, Armor, Archer, Hawknight, Monk, Mage and Cleric. The strengths of each class are determined through a hierarchy similar to the hand game Rock, Paper, Scissors (and Fire Emblem: Genealogy of the Holy War, another tactical role-playing game released in 1996): melee fighters (such as Swordsmen and Armors) are most effective when fighting against Archers. Archers are most effective when fighting against airborne characters such as Hawknights. Hawknights are most effective when fighting against Swordsmen. The other three classes are magic-users: the Monk pairs healing magic with average physical strength, where the Mage specializes in attack magic, and the Cleric specializes in healing magic. In addition, Mages are also most effective against Armor. Most magic-using classes have weak defensive capabilities when compared to other classes in the game and most attacking magic spells are stronger against heavily armored opponents.

Reception

Vandal Hearts received primarily mixed reviews. Critics generally praised the incorporation of three-dimensional terrain and positioning into combat strategy, the sound effects, and the visual spectacle of the spells. However, most critics disapproved of the linear progression of the gameplay and story.

Reviews in both GameSpot and Next Generation likened Vandal Hearts to a bare bones reduction of the Shining Force games, eliminating the exploration, town wandering, and replay elements that had helped make those games classics. Next Generation nonetheless had a firmly positive overall assessment, arguing that "the lack of exploration is offset by the extremely engaging combat sequences." GameSpot instead considered it a "fatal flaw", and deemed Vandal Hearts a typical example of a fifth generation game with solid design and impressive graphics but less advanced gameplay than games of previous generations, though the reviewer highly praised the strategy involved in the battles. Robert Bannert at MAN!AC was positive about the game, but said it lacked depth and has little replay value. He cited the lack of hidden characters and an interactive storyline as weakness of the game, but praised the variety of the 3D terrain.

GamePro found several elements of the gameplay unusual and refreshing, such as the ability to choose each character's class, and was especially pleased with the full motion video cutscenes. The reviewer concluded, "Vandal Hearts original gameplay and strong graphics and sounds should satisfy even the most particular RPGers." Dan Hsu of Electronic Gaming Monthly (EGM) criticized that the game sometimes spoils its own plot twists through its use of omniscient point of view, for instance by showing that the player characters are being betrayed before they learn it themselves. However, he praised the enemy AI and said the variety created by the different character classes "won me over." He and his three co-reviewers gave it EGMs "Game of the Month" award.

EGM named Vandal Hearts a runner-up for "Strategy Game of the Year" (behind Command & Conquer: Red Alert) at their 1997 Editors' Choice Awards.

References

External links
 

1996 video games
Fantasy video games
Konami franchises
Konami games
Cancelled Nintendo DS games
PlayStation (console) games
Sega Saturn games
Windows games
Tactical role-playing video games
Video games about time travel
Video games scored by Miki Higashino
Video games developed in Japan
Single-player video games